Nofut (also Romanized as Nofūt and Nafūt; also known as Neqūt and Nufut) is a village in Kasma Rural District, in the Central District of Sowme'eh Sara County, Gilan Province, Iran. At the 2006 census, its population was 879, in 248 families.

References 

Populated places in Sowme'eh Sara County